FOM may refer to:

Air transport 
 Fillmore Municipal Airport (FAA LID code: FOM), an airport in Utah, United States
 Foumban Nkounja Airport (IATA code: FOM), an airport in Cameroon
 Freedom Air (ICAO code: FOM), a defunct low-cost airline

Education 
 Faculty of Occupational Medicine (Ireland), in the Republic of Ireland
 Faculty of Occupational Medicine (United Kingdom), in the United Kingdom
 FOM University of Applied Sciences for Economics and Management, a German university

Organizations 
 Federación Obrera de Magallanes, a Chilean trade union
 Fraternal Order of Moai, a North American social club
 Friends of Maldives
 Friends of Mongolia
 Friends of Oswald Mosley, a British fascist organisation

Other uses 
 Face of Mankind, a multiplayer online role-playing game
 MLB Front Office Manager, a video game
 Federation of Malaya, now part of Malaysia
 Figure of merit
 Formula One Management, a racing promoter
 Foundations of mathematics
 Freedom of Movement, free travel in the EU
 Front Office Manager (disambiguation)
 Fundusz Obrony Morskiej, a defunct fund-raising venture of the Polish government

See also 
 fom, ISO 639 code of the Foma language
 Phom (disambiguation)